Holocola is a genus of moths of the family Tortricidae.

Species
Holocola aethalostola (Turner, 1946)
Holocola ammostigma (Turner, 1946)
Holocola argyrotypa (Turner, 1927)
Holocola atmophanes (Turner, 1946)
Holocola baeodes (Turner, 1946)
Holocola chalcitis (Meyrick, 1911)
Holocola charopa (Meyrick, 1888)
Holocola chlidana (Turner, 1927)
Holocola deloschema (Turner, 1914)
Holocola dolopaea ((Meyrick, 1905) 
Holocola ebenostigma (Turner, 1946)
Holocola emplasta (Meyrick, 1901)
Holocola fluidana (Meyrick, 1881)
Holocola honesta (Meyrick, 1911)
Holocola hypomolybda (Turner, 1927)
Holocola imbrifera (Meyrick, 1911)
Holocola ischalea (Meyrick, 1911)
Holocola liturata (Turner, 1925)
Holocola lucifera (Turner, 1946)
Holocola melanographa (Turner, 1916)
Holocola morosa (Meyrick, 1911)
Holocola niphosticha (Turner, 1946)
Holocola nitida (Turner, 1946)
Holocola notosphena (Turner, 1946)
Holocola obeliscana (Meyrick, 1881)
Holocola ochropepla (Turner, 1926)
Holocola opsia (Meyrick, 1911)
Holocola parthenia (Meyrick, 1888)
Holocola pellopis (Turner, 1946)
Holocola peraea (Meyrick, 1911)
Holocola pericyphana (Meyrick, 1881)
Holocola periptycha (Turner, 1946)
Holocola perspectana (Walker, 1863)
Holocola phaeoscia (Turner, 1916)
Holocola plinthinana (Meyrick, 1881)
Holocola seditiosana (Meyrick, 1881)
Holocola sicariana (Meyrick, 1881)
Holocola sollicitana (Meyrick, 1881)
Holocola spanistis (Meyrick, 1911)
Holocola spodostola (Turner, 1946)
Holocola striphromita (Turner, 1946)
Holocola tarachodes (Meyrick, 1911)
Holocola thalassinana Meyrick, 1881
Holocola tranquilla Meyrick, 1881
Holocola triangulana Meyrick, 1881
Holocola vitiosa (Meyrick, 1911)
Holocola zopherana (Meyrick, 1881)

See also
List of Tortricidae genera

References

External links
tortricidae.com

Eucosmini
Tortricidae genera
Taxa named by Edward Meyrick